The Gummeson Gallery, (Galleri Gummeson) is a Contemporary art gallery situated on Strandvägen in Stockholm, Sweden.

History
It was launched in 1912 by Carl Gummeson, a local bookdealer, and quickly gained a reputation for its support of Modern Art. 
In 1916 it held an exhibition for Wassily Kandinsky, and subsequently Paul Klee, Edvard Munch, Folke Heybroek, and Andy Warhol (1972).  It has also promoted Swedish artists including Isaac Grünewald and Gösta Adrian-Nilsson, and expressionists Torsten Renqvist and Staffan Hallström.

See also
Contemporary art gallery

References

Contemporary art galleries in Sweden
1912 establishments in Sweden
Art galleries established in 1912
Art museums and galleries in Stockholm